1906 Florida hurricane may refer to:
The 1906 Florida Keys hurricane, a Category 3 hurricane which killed over 240 people
The 1906 Mississippi hurricane, a Category 3 hurricane which caused catastrophic impacts in Pensacola and Mobile, Alabama